The Lithuanian Auxiliary Police Battalions were Schutzmannschaft battalions formed during the German occupation of Lithuania between 1941 and 1944, with the first battalions originating from the most reliable freedom fighters that were disbanded following the anti-Soviet Lithuanian June Uprising in 1941. Lithuanian activists hoped that these units would be the basis of the reestablished Lithuanian Army and commanded by the Lithuanian Provisional Government. Instead, these units were placed under the orders of the SS- und Polizeiführer in Lithuania. The battalions were charged with internal security duties and engaged in anti-partisan operations in the Wehrmacht's rear areas, e.g. Ukraine, Belarus, Poland and Northwest Russia. 

Some battalions partook in the Holocaust, most notably the 12th and the 13th battalions, which started as the Lithuanian TDA Battalions. These two battalions are estimated to have been responsible for an estimated 78,000 Jewish deaths in Lithuania and Belarus. While the battalions were often deployed outside Lithuania, they generally did not participate in combat. In total, 26 battalions were formed and approximately 13,000 men served in them. In July–September, 1944, the remaining units were combined into two Lithuanian Volunteer Infantry Regiments.

Terminology
The units are known under a number of different names. German documents referred to them as Ordnungsdienst (order service), Selbstschutz (self-defense), Hilfspolizei (auxiliary police). From September 1941, they became known as Schutzmannschaft-Bataillonen (abbreviated Schuma). In Lithuanian, the police battalions were known as savisaugos batalionai (self-defense battalions), apsaugos dalys (security units), Lietuvos apsaugos dalys (LAD, security units of Lithuania).

Sources and historiography
The topic of Lithuanian Police Battalions is very controversial and poorly researched. The main obstacle is the lack of reliable and objective data. During the war, journal Karys published frequent stories about the battalions, but to protect military secrets the articles were heavily censored to remove names, dates, and locations. During the Soviet period, when Soviet propaganda exploited tales of war crimes and actively persecuted former members of the battalions, objective research was impossible. Several members of the battalions managed to escape to the West and publish memoirs, but they gloss over the controversial aspects of the battalions and often deny Lithuanian involvement in the Holocaust. Foreign researchers were hampered by lack of archival data.

When Lithuania declared independence, the archives became accessible to scholars. However, many of the documents are scattered in various archives in Lithuania, Belarus, Ukraine, Germany, Russia. In addition, due to the chaotic nature of the war, recordkeeping was poor, particularly towards the end of the war. The units were subject to frequent reorganizations and restructurings; sometimes the units were confused themselves of their proper name or numbering. In the post-war years, KGB produced interrogation protocols of former members of the battalions, but these are not considered reliable as confessions were often obtained through torture or outright fabricated. Nevertheless, Lithuanian scholars, primarily Arūnas Bubnys, published several articles analyzing structure and activities of individual battalions.

Background 

In June 1940, Lithuania was occupied by the Soviet Union. The Soviets introduced harsh sovietization policies, including nationalization of larger enterprises, landholdings, and real estate. Opponents of communism and the new regime were persecuted: an estimated 6,600 were imprisoned as "enemies of the people" and another 17,600 deported to Siberia. The Lithuanian Army was reorganized into the 29th Rifle Corps (179th Rifle and 184th Rifle Divisions) of the Red Army. More than 500 of Lithuanian officers were retired and 87 were imprisoned.

When Nazi Germany invaded Soviet Union on June 22, 1941, Lithuanians greeted the Germans as liberators from the repressive Soviet rule. They spontaneously joined the anti-Soviet June Uprising, formed the Provisional Government of Lithuania, and declared restoration of independence. Lithuanians began forming their own military and police units in hopes to recreate the Lithuanian Army. The territory of Lithuania was invaded by and divided between two German Army Groups: Army Group North, which took over western and northern Lithuania, and Army Group Centre, which took over most of the Vilnius Region. Therefore, developments in Kaunas and Vilnius were parallel but separate.

Formation 
The first battalion, known as the Tautinio darbo apsaugos batalionas (TDA), was formed by the Provisional Government of Lithuania in Kaunas on June 28. The Provisional Government dissolved itself on August 5, 1941. The battalion was not dissolved and German Major Franz Lechthaler took over its command. On August 7, when TDA had 703 members, Lechthaler ordered the battalion to be reorganized into two battalions of auxiliary police (or PPT). During August three more battalions of PPT were formed. In October, these five battalions were renamed to security battalions. In December, the five battalions were reorganized again into battalions of Schutzmannschaft.

Lithuanian men massively deserted from the Soviet 29th Rifle Corps and gathered in Vilnius. They organized Lithuanian Self-defense Units ( or LSD), stationed in Vilnius, Pabradė, Trakai, and Varėna. On July 21, 1941, LSD was reorganized into Vilnius Reconstruction Service ( or VAT) that had three units (Work, Order, and Security). On August 1, VAT and its three units were reorganized into three battalions of Schutzmannschaft. Two more battalions were organized before October 1941.

Atrocities
Some Lithuanian auxiliary police battalions took an active part in extermination of Jewish people in territory of Lithuania, Belarus, Ukraine, Russia and Poland and committed crimes against Polish and Belarusian populations. One such action of Lithuanian policemen was liquidation of Jews in Kaunas in October 1941 by 12th Police Battalion under command of Antanas Impulevičius. Later the same month 12th battalion murdered the entire Jewish population of Slutsk in Belarus. 2nd Police Battalion served as guards in Majdanek death camp in occupied Poland. 20 out of 22 Lithuanian Auxiliary Police Battalions was directly involved in destruction of Jewish people in Eastern Europe. According to German reports, Lithuanians committed 47,000 killings of Jews in Lithuania out of all 85,000 committed by Einsatzkommando there. They also killed 50,000 Belarusian Jews during the war. Largest crime against non-Jewish civilian population of Lithuanian policemen was killing of about 400 Polish people in the villages Švenčionėliai and Švenčionys and their surroundings.

List of battalions

References
Notes

Bibliography

The Holocaust in Lithuania
Lithuanian Schutzmannschaft Battalions
Paramilitary organizations based in Lithuania
Anti-communist organizations